The United States House Committee on Insular Affairs is a defunct committee of the U.S. House of Representatives.

The Treaty of Paris, signed on December 10, 1898, officially concluded the Spanish–American War. According to the provisions of the treaty, Spain ceded the Philippine Islands, Puerto Rico and Guam to the United States, and relinquished her sovereignty over Cuba. On January 1, 1899, the Spanish evacuated Cuba, and control of the island was assumed by a military governor who represented the United States. On December 8, 1899, the U.S. House established the Committee on Insular Affairs to consider "all matters (excepting those affecting the revenue and appropriations) pertaining to the islands which came to the United States through the treaty of 1899 with Spain, and to Cuba."

Just 6 days earlier, on December 6, 1899, the United States had acquired exclusive rights to certain islands in Samoa through an agreement with Britain and Germany. Subsequently, matters relating to American Samoa also came within the committee's jurisdiction. In 1902 the Republic of Cuba was established, and jurisdiction over matters concerning Cuba was transferred to the Committee on Foreign Affairs in 1906. Eventually, the jurisdiction of the Committee on Insular Affairs was expanded to cover the United States Virgin Islands which were purchased from Denmark by the treaty in 1916. In 1946 the committee was abolished and its responsibilities transferred to the Committee on Public Lands.

Chairmen

References

 Records of the Committee on Insular Affairs (1899-1946), Chapter 13. Records of the Committee on Interior and Insular Affairs and Its Predecessors, Guide to the Records of the U.S. House of Representatives at the National Archives, 1789–1989 (Record Group 233), National Archives and Records Administration

Insular Affairs